Hidden Voices (abbreviated GAGA) is a Vietnamese television mystery music game show series that formally recognised as part of I Can See Your Voice franchise. Based on original format of the South Korean counterpart under modified battle format, it features a group of "mystery singers", with the objective of two opposing guest artists are to eliminate potential bad singers, assisted by clues and celebrity panelists; and the game ends with duets between the last remaining mystery singers and one of the opposing guest artists.

Overall, the series has played 105 guest artists that aired five seasons with 92 episodes on HTV7 (from its debut on 5 November 2016 to 4 October 2020).

Series overview

Episodes

Season 1 (2016—17)

Season 2 (2017—18)

Season 3 (2018)

Season 4 (2019—20)

Season 5 (2020)

Specials

Notes

References

Hidden Voices (game show)
Lists of Vietnamese television series episodes